St John's Church is in Washington Street, Workington, Cumbria, England.  It is an active Anglican parish church in the deanery of Solway, the archdeaconry of West Cumberland, and the diocese of Carlisle.  The church is recorded in the National Heritage List for England as a designated Grade II* listed building.  It is a Commissioners' church, having received a grant towards its construction from the Church Building Commission.

History
St John's was built between 1822 and 1823, and was designed by Thomas Hardwick, originally as a chapel of ease.  A grant of £10,488 (equivalent to £ as of ) was given towards its construction by the Church Building Commission.  The tower, originally built in wood, was rebuilt in stone in 1847 by Nelson of Carlisle.  The altar was originally at the west end, and the church was re-orientated in 1897–99 by W. and C. A. Bassett-Smith, placing the altar at the east end.  In 1930–31 this was reverted to its original position by Ninian Comper.

Architecture

Exterior
The church is constructed in hammer-dressed calciferous sandstone with an ashlar plinth, pilasters and eaves.  The roof is in green slate.  Its architectural style is Neoclassical, and the design is based on that of St Paul's, Covent Garden.  The tower and portico are at the east end.  The tower is square at the base, then becomes octagonal, with pairs of pilasters, and has a round cap at the top.  The portico is supported by two large columns.  Along the sides of the church are tall round-headed windows.

Interior
The interior of the church is in five bays.  There is no chancel.  There are galleries on three sides of the church, supported on thin fluted cast iron columns.  The plaster ceiling is flat, and is decorated with ribbing and coats of arms.  At the west end is a completely gilded Italianate baldacchino.  This was designed by Comper, as were the cover of the font, the stained glass in the east window, and the organ case, which is in Ionic style.  The two manual organ was built in 1905 by Richard Heslop, and was rebuilt in 1961 by Rushworth and Dreaper.

See also

Listed buildings in Workington
List of Commissioners' churches in Northeast and Northwest England

References

External links
Visit Cumbria
St. John's Workington Website

Grade II* listed churches in Cumbria
Church of England church buildings in Cumbria
Diocese of Carlisle
19th-century Church of England church buildings
Neoclassical architecture in Cumbria
Commissioners' church buildings
Workington
Neoclassical church buildings in England